Michelle Morgan (born July 16, 1981) is a Canadian actress, producer, director and writer best known for her role as Lou Fleming on the CBC series Heartland.

Personal life
Michelle Morgan was born in Calgary and grew up in Toronto and Vancouver. After studying Theatre and Classical Literature at the University of Toronto, Michelle went on to pursue a career in theatre and film.

Morgan is an advocate for women's rights and has volunteered at women's shelters across Canada for the past 15 years. She served as the "I Am Courage" campaign ambassador for the Brenda Strafford Centre for the Prevention of Domestic Violence and the "My Homefront" campaign ambassador for Homefront, a Calgary-based nonprofit that serves victims of domestic abuse.

On June 30, 2012 she married Derek Tisdelle. They have three children, Mara Carmen, Noah Santiago, and Celeste.

Career
In 2007, Michelle began her role as Lou on the CBC series Heartland. The same year, she appeared in the zombie film Diary of the Dead.

In 2008 she appeared on Stargate Atlantis as FRAN (Friendly Replicator Android) in the episodes "Be All My Sins Remember'd" and "Ghost in the Machine". 

In 2018, she founded her own film business, "Medano Films".

Her first short film, "Mi Madre, My Father" (2017), with Stephen Amell, was selected by Telefilm Canada for the "Not Short On Talent Corner" at Cannes Film Festival in May 2018. Michelle's debut film has screened at festivals such as Hollyshorts, the Brooklyn Women's Film Festival and the Vancouver Short Film Festival. 

In 2019, Michelle directed three episodes of the new CBC digital series "Hudson", a spin off of the long running series Heartland.

Michelle' s second short film, "Save Yourself" (2019), is a romantic comedy set on the beaches of Tofino, British Columbia.

In 2020, Michelle was selected to join the Women in the "Director's Chair, Story & Leadership Program" where she will develop her feature film project, a post apocalyptic western titled "The Plains".

Filmography

Film

Short film

Television film

Series

Web series

References

External links
 

1981 births
Actresses from Calgary
Canadian film actresses
Canadian television actresses
Living people
Canadian women singers